Nysa or Nyssa (flourished second half of 2nd century BC and first half of 1st century BC) was a Greek Princess from the Kingdom of Bithynia.

Biography
Nysa was the daughter of the Monarchs Nicomedes III of Bithynia and Nysa, a princess from the Kingdom of Cappadocia. She was the namesake of her mother and had several half-brothers, Nicomedes IV of Bithynia from her fathers first marriage to Aristonica, (who reigned as king from c. 94 BC to c. 74 BC), Socrates Chrestus born by her fathers concubine Hagne, and possibly Pylaemenes III by an unknown woman (whom her father placed as king Paphlagonia). She was born and raised in Bithynia.

According to Suetonius (Caesar. 49), her cause was defended by the Roman Politician Gaius Julius Caesar in gratitude for her father's friendship.

Cultural depictions
Nysa is mentioned but does not appear in the novel The October Horse by Colleen McCullough. She appears briefly in Hail, Caesar! by Fletcher Pratt.

Ancestry

References

Sources
 McGing, B. C., The foreign policy of Mithridates VI Eupator, King of Pontus (Mnemosyne Series, Suppl.89), BRILL, 1986;  
 Smith, Dictionary of Greek and Roman Biography and Mythology, v. 2, page 1218 

2nd-century BC Greek women
1st-century BC Greek women
People from Bithynia
Ancient Greek priestesses
2nd-century BC Greek people
1st-century BC Greek people
2nd-century BC clergy
1st-century BC clergy